Energy in Romania describes energy and electricity production, consumption and import in Romania.

Romania has significant oil and gas reserves, substantial coal deposits and it has considerable installed hydroelectric power. However, Romania imports oil and gas from Russia and other countries. To ease this dependency Romania seeks to use nuclear power as an alternative for electricity generation. So far, the country has two nuclear reactors, located at Cernavodă, accounting for about 18–20% of the country's electricity production, with the second one online in 2007. Nuclear waste is stored on site at reprocessing facilities.

Electric power in Romania is dominated by government enterprises, although privately operated coal mines and oil refineries also existed. Accordingly, Romania placed an increasingly heavy emphasis on developing nuclear power generation. Electric power was provided by the Romanian Electric Power Corporation (CONEL). Energy sources used in electric power generation consisted primarily of nuclear, coal, oil, and liquefied natural gas (LNG). Of the electricity generated in 2007, 13.1 percent came from nuclear plants then in operation, 41.69 percent from thermal plants (oil and coal), and 25.8 percent from hydroelectric sites. It was predicted in 2007 that the generation structure by 2010 would be 10.2 percent hydroelectric, 12.2 percent oil, 22.9 percent coal, 10.2 percent LNG, and 44.5 percent nuclear.

Overview

Energy strategy 2007 
According to the National Energy Strategy adopted by the government in September 2007, investments in upgrading power plants would top EUR 35 bln in the 2007–2020 period. EUR 8.6 bln will be invested in the electricity generation.

Climate change 

In the decade between 1989 and 1999, Romania saw decrease of its greenhouse gas emissions by 55%. This can be accounted for by a 45% decrease in energy use due to languishing economy, and a 15% decrease in its carbon intensity of energy use. In this period of time the carbon intensity of Romania's economy decreased by 40%, while Romania's GDP declined 15%. Romania's GDP has recovered significantly since then.

Hydrocarbons

Possessing substantial oil refining capacities, Romania is particularly interested in the Central Asia – Europe pipelines and seeks to strengthen its relations with some Persian Gulf states. Romania's refining capacity far exceeds domestic demand for refined petroleum products, allowing the country to export a wide range of oil products and petrochemicals—such as lubricants, bitumen, and fertilizers—throughout the region.

Electric power

See also 
 Energy policy of Romania
 Wind power in Romania
 Solar power in Romania
 Geothermal power in Romania
 Hydroelectricity in Romania
 Renewable energy by country

References

 
Romania